The 2007 Samsung 500, the seventh race of the 2007 Nextel Cup Series, was held on Sunday, April 15 of that year at the 1.5-mile Texas Motor Speedway in Fort Worth, Texas. The race was won by Jeff Burton of Richard Childress Racing. Jeff Gordon would lead the most laps with 173 laps led.

Race recap
It was the third race to feature the Car of Tomorrow. Hendrick Motorsports was shooting for its fifth consecutive win as a team. The last team to accomplish this feat was Petty Enterprises in 1971. HMS driver Jeff Gordon started from pole as qualifying was rained out. The race itself featured many attritions, including a hard first lap crash involving David Ragan, J. J. Yeley, and Ricky Rudd. Gordon dominated the early part of the race until a pit mistake forced him to lose the lead. November Texas winner Tony Stewart struggled throughout the day, first being spun out after contact with rookie Juan Pablo Montoya, and being hit by Jimmie Johnson in the driver's side, and spun again later. However, Dale Earnhardt Jr., who got his first cup win at Texas, slowed to avoid the spinning Stewart, but was hit from behind by Kyle Busch, who was traveling over 30 mph faster. In the end, the race came down to former Texas Motor Speedway winners and ex-teammates Matt Kenseth and Jeff Burton. Burton attempted many times to pass Kenseth low, but he held the top spot. On the last lap, however, Burton was able to get underneath and clear Kenseth off turn 2 and hold him off to become the first repeat winner of a Cup series event held at the speedway.

While Burton won his second race, being the first repeat winner, still the past twelve races have been won by twelve different drivers, and it was the fourth different winning team at Texas Motor Speedway in the past four races (Roush, Evernham, Gibbs, Childress), with the past three teams winning at Texas winning for the first time.

On lap 288, Dale Earnhardt Jr.'s engine blew up, forcing him to retire. Meanwhile, Kyle Busch, who was also wrecked was out, but the team still wanted to compete until the end. However, Busch was nowhere to be found as he had already left the speedway. Therefore, a crew member from Busch's team asked Earnhardt Jr. if he would drive the rest of the laps to finish the car. Earnhardt agreed, and would ride the last 10 laps in Kyle Busch's No. 5 car owned by Rick Hendrick. Earnhardt Jr. said of the incident "I’ll always jump at a chance to climb into someone else’s car to see what it’s like. They used to do that all the time back in the day. You’d have relief drivers getting into someone’s car almost every week, so it was kinda like a step back into NASCAR history or something. Old school! It was cool.”

Earnhardt signed a contract with Hendrick one day after the race. Busch signed a contract to go to Joe Gibbs Racing to drive the No. 18 car.

Race results

Failed to Qualify-#00-David Reutimann, #36-Jeremy Mayfield, #37-John Andretti, #84-A. J. Allmendinger, #55-Michael Waltrip, #4-Ward Burton, #33-Scott Wimmer, #34-Kevin Lepage

References

External links
Complete race results 
Points standings after this race 
Starting lineup (set by NASCAR rule book due to rain, thunderstorm, and tornado warning in area) 

Samsung 500
Samsung 500
21st century in Fort Worth, Texas
NASCAR races at Texas Motor Speedway
April 2007 sports events in the United States